Dayton International Airport  (officially James M. Cox Dayton International Airport), formerly Dayton Municipal Airport and James M. Cox-Dayton Municipal Airport, is 10 miles north of downtown Dayton, in Montgomery County, Ohio, United States. The airport is in an exclave of the city of Dayton not contiguous with the rest of the city. Its address is 3600 Terminal Drive, Dayton, Ohio 45377. The airport is headquarters for American Eagle carrier PSA Airlines.

The National Plan of Integrated Airport Systems called it a primary commercial service airport. Dayton International is the third busiest and third largest airport in Ohio behind Cleveland Hopkins International Airport and John Glenn Columbus International Airport. (While Cincinnati's airport is also busier, it is located in the neighboring state of Kentucky.)

Dayton International Airport handled 2,607,528 passengers in 2012 and had 57,914 combined takeoffs and landings in 2012. Dayton ranked No. 76 in U.S. airport boardings in 2008. The airport has non-stop flights to 17 destinations.

History
In August 1928 a property in Vandalia, Ohio was called the "Dayton Airport".

On December 17, 1936, the airport opened as the "Dayton Municipal Airport" with three  concrete runways and connecting taxiways.

In 1952 the city named the airport "James M. Cox-Dayton Municipal Airport" in honor of the former Governor of Ohio and Democratic candidate for President of the United States. A groundbreaking ceremony was held in 1959 for a new $5.5 million terminal designed by Yount, Sullivan and Lecklider, completed in 1961. The airport's name became "James M. Cox Dayton International Airport" in 1975.

The April 1957 OAG shows 73-weekday departures: 56 TWA, 13 American, and 4 Lake Central. TWA had two nonstops to New York but no other nonstops reached beyond Chicago-Detroit-Cleveland-Pittsburgh-Cincinnati. The first jets were TWA Convair 880s from Chicago in January 1961.

The airport was a hub for Piedmont Airlines from July 1, 1982, until its merger with US Airways, which continued the Dayton hub for a year or two. In March 1988 Piedmont had nonstops from Dayton to 27 airports, California to Boston to Florida, plus eight more on its prop affiliate. USAir and successor US Airways kept Dayton as a focus-city. The airport was a hub for Emery Worldwide, a freight carrier.

In 1981 Emery Worldwide completed an air freight hub sortation facility next to Runway 6L–24R. Emery added to the facility until the early 1990s, making it one of the world's largest airfreight facilities at the time.

A $50 million renovation of the airport's terminal building, designed by Levin Porter Associates, was completed in 1989. A new two-lane access road was built.

In 1998 the airport started renovating the terminal building. The $25 million projects was completed in 2002. The renovations included energy-efficient climate control systems, lighting, windows and entry/exit doorways, a new paging system, and ceiling tiles and carpeting. The news, gift shops, and food and beverage concessionaires improved their leased areas in the terminal building.

In 2004, CNF (which had acquired Emery Worldwide in 1989) sold its Menlo Forwarding business to UPS, who operated the Menlo freight facility at Dayton as an air cargo hub and sorting center.

In June 2006, UPS ceased operations at the Menlo cargo facility, consolidating its cargo operation and sorting facility to its Louisville hub, and reducing cargo tonnage through the Dayton airport by 97% from its 2005 peak 

On May 1, 2011 Air Canada Express ended flights to Toronto Pearson, the airport's only international destination, when the airline consolidated its service at Cincinnati/Northern Kentucky International Airport. Dayton now has no scheduled international flights.

On August 12, 2012 Southwest Airlines began serving Dayton with flights to Denver International Airport. This was expected to increase passenger traffic by at least 15 percent.

In 2013 Concourse D, built in 1978 and used by Piedmont Airlines and US Airways for their mini-hub operation until its closure in 1991, was demolished.  Concourse C was renamed Concourse A.

In 2015 Southwest Airlines announced a reduction in flights from Dayton: nonstop flights to Baltimore, Denver, Orlando, and Tampa all ended April 11, 2016. This left one nonstop destination from Dayton via Southwest. Passenger traffic is down nearly 9% since 2014, along with aircraft departures down 8%. Fares from Dayton have continued to rise while neighboring airports are lowering fares with new low-cost carriers. Cincinnati/Northern Kentucky International Airport has drastically reduced fares since 2014 while also experiencing over 10% growth in passengers.

On November 19, 2015, Dayton officials announced that Allegiant Air would add service in April twice a week to Orlando and Tampa. Allegiant Air would become the only low-cost fare carrier at the airport and would fill the gap left by Southwest Airlines reduction in flights to Florida.

On January 4, 2017, Southwest announced that it would end its flights to Chicago Midway and move services to Cincinnati/Northern Kentucky International Airport, adding eight daily flights to and from Chicago Midway and Baltimore–Washington International Airport. Southwest's last day in Dayton was June 3, 2017.

It is served by six passenger airlines and has sixteen non-stop destinations. The airport has an estimated $1 billion economic impact on the Dayton area economy.

Construction projects

In 2011, Dayton International Airport completed a new air traffic control tower. The switchover to the new tower was at midnight on June 4, 2011. Construction cost $21 million (the tower project's total cost was $30.6 million including equipment) and will eventually reduce the current staff of 38 controllers in Dayton to 12.

The airport broke ground in April 2009 for a new multi-level parking garage, which opened in the summer of 2010.

A parking lot improvement project began in October 2008 and provided for: (1) the construction of a new entrance/exit for a new "red" long term parking lot and economy parking lot; (2) reconfiguration and restriping of the existing credit card parking lot; (3) installation of revenue control equipment for the overflow parking lot; (4) upgrade of electrical and lighting within various parking lots. These improvements are to be completed in May 2009. The access road to the terminal has been undergoing several upgrades since October 2007 which involves the rehabilitation of Terminal Drive pavement, drainage system upgrades, installation of underground utilities and erection of new signage and other related roadway improvements.

The airport began a multi-year project in October 2006 to the perimeter roadway network to provide access around the airfield and to enhance safety by eliminating vehicle crossing of runways and taxiways. The project was completed in November 2009.

In June 2009, the airport completed a project to enhance safety by improving the 06R/24L runway safety area. In addition, a high-pressure gas transmission main and an  service main were relocated from under the footprint of the runway extension. The installation of wildlife fencing, completed in May 2009, enhances airport safety by reducing the movement of wild animals on the airfield.

In January 2018 the airport began another expansion focusing on the end of the airport with the ticketing counters and the parking garage. This work was completed in August 2018.

Facilities

 06L/24R:  × , asphalt/concrete
 06R/24L:  × , concrete
 18/36:  × , asphalt/concrete

There are thirteen instrument approach procedures: six instrument landing system (ILS) approaches, six Global Positioning System approaches (GPS) and one non-directional beacon (NDB) approach. Runways with an ILS are 6L, 24R, 24L and 18; 6L has capabilities for a CAT II and III ILS procedure. GPS approaches are set up on each runway. Runway 6R is the only runway with an NDB approach.

The terminal has two concourses: Concourse A has 12 jet bridges, and Concourse B has 8.

Traffic
In 2018 the airport had an average of 141 aircraft operations per day totaling in 51,445 operations: 24% general aviation, 42% air taxi, 33% scheduled airline, and <1% military.

In 2012 the airport reported 102,700 departures and about 98,200 in 2013.

Ground transportation and rentals
Taxicab service is available at curbside. Liberty Cab, Dayton Checker Cab, All America Taxi, Dayton Express Company, Diamond Taxi, Petra Cab, Charter Vans Inc. and Skyair, Inc. all provide ground transportation throughout the Dayton metro area. There are also several rental car companies serving the airport. On August 11, 2013, the Greater Dayton Regional Transit Authority began offering public transportation service to and from downtown Dayton. With the exception of a few unsuccessful routes in the past, the airport was not served by local public transportation prior to this date, which made it the second busiest airport in the continental United States lacking public transportation options. As of February 2019, Route 43 serves the airport seven to eight times per day on weekdays, six times on Saturdays, and three times on Sundays.

Amenities
Restaurants include MVP Bar and Grill, 12th Fairway Bar and Grill, Dunkin Donuts (Opening Fall/Winter of 2021), The Great American Bagel Bakery, and Max & Erma's. Several convenience shops and news stands are also located within the airport.

There were two Starbucks locations in the terminal, but they closed due to COVID-19 and will not reopen. The Heritage Booksellers has also closed and been converted to a temporary seating area pending new construction at the airport.

The airport has several Fuel Rod charging stations along with a new Cash to Card machine to pay for checked luggage at airline ticket counters.

Airlines and destinations

Passenger

Cargo

The Dayton International Airport once ranked among the nation's busiest air freight facilities and was the Midwestern hub for Emery Worldwide, a CF company. Emery, which was then operating under the name Menlo Worldwide Forwarding, was acquired by United Parcel Service (UPS) at the end of 2004. UPS closed the facility on June 30, 2006, moving operations to Worldport at Louisville International Airport.

Statistics

Cargo throughput at Dayton

In popular media
In the 2008 film Eagle Eye, the two main characters are told to take a bus to the Dayton International Airport. The airport's name was mentioned several other times in the movie, even though there are no actual screen shots at the Dayton International Airport in the making of the movie. The actual airport scenes were shot at the Los Angeles International Airport.

Accidents
On March 9, 1967, TWA Flight 553, a McDonnell Douglas DC-9-15 jet airliner operated by Trans World Airlines, en route to Dayton when it collided with a Beechcraft Baron over Urbana. Visual flight rules (VFR) were in effect at the time of the accident. However, the uncontrolled VFR traffic around Dayton airspace contributed to, also with high rate of descent of the DC-9 prompted, Federal Aviation Administration's decision to create Terminal Control Areas or TCAs (either called Class B airspace and Class C airspace) coordination. All 25 passengers and crew of the DC-9 and the sole occupant of the Beechcraft were killed.

Both occupants were killed.

On July 28, 2007 an aircraft performing a loop over the airport at the Vectren Dayton Air Show slammed into the runway when attempting to finish the maneuver. The pilot, Jim LeRoy, was killed in the crash.

On June 22, 2013, a stunt plane carrying wing walker Jane Wicker crashed at the air show, killing both Wicker and pilot Charlie Schwenker.

On May 29, 2014, a Cessna 201 with one crew member on board landed with the landing gear not lowered. The pilot was not hurt. It was ruled to be caused by pilot error.

On June 23, 2017, the day before the air show, a United States Air Force Thunderbirds F-16D jet, not scheduled to perform, was taxiing to a staging area after a familiarization flight, when witnesses reported a gust of wind flipped the aircraft onto its top in a grassy area next to the taxiway. Both the pilot and a team crew member were trapped in the airplane for two hours; the pilot suffered only minor injuries while the crew member had no visible injuries. The Thunderbirds canceled their scheduled performances for both days of the air show.

See also

 Dayton-Wright Brothers Airport, a municipal airport south of the city in Miami Township, also owned and operated by the City of Dayton
 List of airports in Ohio
 List of enclaves and exclaves in Montgomery County, Ohio
 Ohio World War II Army Airfields
 Wright-Patterson Air Force Base

References

General

External links

 
 Aerial image as of October 2000 from USGS The National Map
 1956 Jeppesen airport diagram
 
 

Airports in Ohio
Airfields of the United States Army Air Forces in Ohio
Airfields of the United States Army Air Forces Technical Service Command
Transportation in Dayton, Ohio
Buildings and structures in Dayton, Ohio